S Normae (S Nor) is a yellow supergiant variable star in the constellation Norma. It is the brightest member of the open cluster NGC 6087.

S Normae is a Classical Cepheid variable with a visual magnitude range of 6.12 to 6.77 and a period of 9.75411 days. The spectral type varies during the pulsation cycle from F8 to G0.

Companions

S Normae is a spectroscopic binary, although the companion has now been resolved using the Hubble Space Telescope Wide Field Camera 3.  The separation was 0.90" in April 2011, corresponding to 817 AU.  This gives the rare opportunity for a direct determination of the mass of a Cepheid variable star and confirmation of other properties.  It is a supergiant that is 6.3 times as massive as the Sun and 2,800 times as luminous.  The companion a  blue-white main sequence star of spectral type B9.5.

There is a more distant 10th magnitude companion at 30", unsurprising in the centre of an open cluster.  It is TYC 8719-794-1, a chemically peculiar A or B class star.  Three fainter companions have also been found: a 14th magnitude star at 14"; and two 16th magnitude stars at 20".

References

External links
Light curves in UBVRI colours

Norma (constellation)
Normae, S
F-type supergiants
146323
6062
Classical Cepheid variables
B-type main-sequence stars
Durchmusterung objects
079932
Binary stars